Cotton Patch Hills is a community in Bethany Beach, Delaware. Cotton Patch Hills derives its name from the cotton flotsam which spread over the shore dunes after a Spanish merchant vessel ran aground in the 1700's. The vessel contained animal hides, furs, horses, ivory, two elephants, and a giraffe calve.

References

Populated places in Delaware